Ijzim was a village in the Haifa Subdistrict of British Mandate Palestine, 19.5 kilometers south of the city, that was depopulated during the 1948 Arab-Israeli war. Many of its Palestinian inhabitants ended up as refugees in Jenin after a group of Israeli Special Forces, composed of members of the Golani, Carmeli and Alexandroni Brigades, attacked the village in Operation Shoter on 24 July 1948.

Families from Ijzim include the Madis, the Nabhanis and the Alhassans, with the majority of the families derived from the Bani Nabhan tribe. Collectively, they owned over 40,000 dunams (40 km2) of land and were considered one of the richest villages in Palestine.

History
The site has been occupied since prehistoric times.  It flourished especially in the Byzantine and Mamluk periods. Multiple oil presses indicate a rural economy with olives as a major product.

Ottoman rule
In 1596, Ijzim was a village in the nahiya of Shafa (liwa''' of Lajjun), with a population of 10 Muslim households; an estimated 55 persons. The villagers  paid a fixed tax rate of 25% on a number of crops, including wheat, barley, and olives as well as on other types of produce, such as goats and beehives; a total of 12,000 akçe.

The village appeared, though misplaced, under the name of Egzim on the map that Pierre Jacotin compiled during Napoleon's invasion of 1799.

Ijzim was the primary seat of the Banu Madi family and the largest locality in the region during part of the eighteenth and first half of the nineteenth century.  The "area of origin" of the Madi family was the coastal region south of Carmel and the Western slopes of Jabal Nablus.  At the time, the Banu Madi were the most influential family in Southern Galilee and on the coast. The heyday of the family appears to have been in the period between  the end of Jazzar Pasha´s rule (1804) and the Egyptian occupation (1831). Mas'ud al-Madi was the governor of Gaza at the time of the Egyptian invasion. He lost his life because of his participation in the anti-Egyptian uprising in 1834, while other clan members were put to prison and some were able to flee to Constantinople. After the return of the Ottomans, some family members were appointed as shaykhs or governors in Ijzim, Haifa, and Safad. Yet by the 1850s the al-Madi family of Ijzim no longer constituted a local power like some families of Nablus or Hebron.

In 1859 Ijzim was visited by the British Consul Rodgers, who estimated 1,000 inhabitants, who cultivated 64 feddans of land.

The French explorer Victor Guérin visited in 1870 and found "an ancient marble column at the door of a mosque; in the valley below the village a large square well, built with regular stones and surmounted by a vaulted construction. Near the well a birket, no longer used, and partly filled up, and close at hand the foundations of an ancient tower, measuring 15 paces by 10, and built with large masonry." In 1873, the Survey of Western Palestine surveyed  three ancient rock-cut tombs north of the village.
The most known native families there was the (Zidan and Awaga (the largest family of the village) Ammar, Jizmawi, Bani Hermas (Beit Madi, Beit Khadish), Al-Awasi and Al-Zayd [and among them Mishnish], Al-Azayza Abd Al-Hadi, Al-Wishahi, Al-Balwata, Al-Tawafshah, Eid, Awad, Mohsen, Abu Hamda, Abu Shuqur, Abu Shuqair, Al-Wawi, Al-Jabr, Jiyab, Abu Omar, Abu Shakra and the heart of The Abd al-Mu’ti family: the family of Nawfal, al-Darawsheh, Abu Hamed, Abu Sariya, Abu Khalifa, al-Farayza, Asaad, al-Nabhani, Ghuraify, and Abu Harb).

British Mandate era
In the 1922 census of Palestine conducted by the British Mandate authorities, Ijzim had a population 1,610, one Christian and the rest Muslims. In the 1931 census Ijzim was counted together with Khirbat Al-Manara, Al-Mazar and Qumbaza. The total population was 2,160, 88 Christians, 2,082  Muslims, in a total of 442 houses.

In the 1945 statistics  the population of Ijzim was 2,970; 2,830 Muslims and 140 Christians, and it had 45,905 dunams of land according to an official land and population survey.  2,367  dunams were for plantations and irrigable land, 17,791 for cereals, while 91 dunams were built-up (urban) land.

1948 War and aftermath

Ijzim was one of the three villages in the Little Triangle that blocked the Jewish transportation in the main Tel Aviv-Haifa Highway for many months during the 1948 war. Jewish forces had twice attempted to capture the village unsuccessfully. Their third attempt on the 24 July 1948 involved the use of cannon fire and air strikes in a fierce battle that lasted two days. This took place during an official truce in the fighting, the attack was therefore called a "police action", and the Israeli authorities later lied to the United Nations, claiming that no military planes were involved.

With the conquest of Ijzim, the majority of the villagers either were expelled or fled. The majority ended up in the Jenin area, on the other side of the armistice lines drawn in 1949. Others took refuge in the nearby Druze village of Daliyat al-Carmel. There were several dozen people from Ijzim that were allowed to remain in their homes due to connections they enjoyed with influential Jews. These individuals continued to work their fertile land, sending the agricultural produce to Haifa. They were registered in the first Israeli census and received Israeli identity cards.

In December 1948, the Jewish protectors of the residents of Ijzim and the Haifa district military commander had a dispute over the villagers' continued presence there. It was decided that the villagers that had remained in Ijzim could stay and those who had taken refuge in Daliyat al-Carmel would be permitted to return. However, the district commander later went back on his word and ordered the eviction of the villagers, who then took shelter in the nearby village of Fureidis.

Meron Benvenisti submits that one of the considerations leading to the eviction of the inhabitants of Ijzim was the interest of settlement agency officials in turning Ijzim into an immigrant moshav. In the summer of 1949, just a few months after the villagers had been evicted, a moshav made up of immigrants from Czechoslovakia and Romania was established in Ijzim.

In many other villages depopulated during the 1948 Palestinian exodus, the Arab houses were demolished and permanent Jewish settlements were built where they had stood. However, the homes of Ijzim were maintained for habitation by the new immigrants. The al-Madi family's luxurious seventeenth-century madafeh (guest house, see Diwan-khane) was transformed into a museum and then the home of a Jewish family, the village school became a synagogue, and the village cemetery, a public park. The large village mosque, constructed in the nineteenth century, was left to fall into dereliction.

Some of the villagers of Ijzim attempted to hold on to their land, living for a few years in tin-roofed shacks and other temporary structures. However, all of them — with the exception of one family — finally broke down and agreed to exchange their land holdings in Ijzim for building plots in the village of Fureidis. The one Arab family that withstood the pressure to leave continues to live in its own house beside a sacred spring called Sitt Maqura, where today both Arabs and Jews come to pray and light candles.

Ami Ayalon, a former head of the Shin Bet secret service agency, lives in one of the former houses of Ijzim.

Andrew Petersen, an archaeologist specializing in Islamic architecture, surveyed the village in 1994, and described two larger structures; the mosque and the "castle".

 Demographics 

Notable people
Adnan Awad, politician, revolutionary
Mas'ud al-Madi, politician, revolutionary
Mu'in al-Madi, politician
Taqiuddin al-Nabhani, judge, Islamic scholar, politician 
Yusuf an-Nabhani, judge, poet, Islamic scholar

See also
Depopulated Palestinian locations in Israel

References

Bibliography

 

  

 
  
 

Mülinen, Egbert Friedrich von  1908,    Beiträge zur Kenntnis des Karmels'' "Separateabdruck aus der Zeitschrift des Deutschen Palëstina-Vereins Band XXX (1907) Seite 117-207 und Band XXXI (1908) Seite 1-258."  Ikzim p.287 ff

 
Rogers, Edward Thomas  (1855)  Notices of the modern Samaritans: illustrated by incidents in the life of Jacob Esh Shelaby    Published by S.Low,  55 pages

 
 (Sharon, 2013, p.  303)

External links
Welcome To Ijzim
Ijzim, Zochrot
Survey of Western Palestine, Map 8:  IAA, Wikimedia commons  
  Ijzim photos, from Dr. Moslih Kanaaneh
Ijzim,  from the Khalil Sakakini Cultural Center

Arab villages depopulated during the 1948 Arab–Israeli War
District of Haifa